Sam Uche Anyamele, is an actor in Nigerian cinema.

Personal life
Anyamele was born in Isolo, Lagos as the eldest of the family with six siblings: three boys and three girls. He completed education from Faronbi Primary School Isolo (1988 to 1993) and Ukwa East Local Government Area in Abia State and later to Isolo Grammar School (1993 to 1999). He completed a primary degree in Business Education in 2007 and Advertising and secondary degree in Promotion Management in 2009 at the University of Lagos.

He is married to longtime partner, Osarhieme Edokpolor, where the wedding has celebrated at Off Ugbor Village Road in GRA.

Career
He used to play musical instruments at the Assembly of God Church. In 2004, he made maiden television appearance with Wale Adenuga’s story, No pain No Gain. In 2006, he won the Africa Movie Academy Award (AMAA) for Most Promising Actor for the role in Day of Atonement. He also worked as the Secretary-General of the National Association of Nigerian Theatre Arts Practitioners.

In 2019, Anyamele was appointed as the brand ambassador of Max Garden Estate. Later in the same year, he was announced as a host of Mykmary Fashion Show which was held on 31 August 2019.

In 2021, Anyamele made a minor comeback in the remake of the movie Aki and Pawpaw of the same title. He acted alongside Uti Nwachukwu, Chinedu Ikedieze and Osita Iheme.

In the same year, Anyamele alongside actors Omowumi Dada, Adeniyi Johnson, played the role of Governor Yanju Badru in the award winning short film Rebirth, a Homevida production, directed by Psalm Oderinde and Gbenga Adeoti, and written by a duo of Thecla Uzozie and Dawn-Ntekim Rex.

Filmography

References

External links
 
 Nollywood calls for bundled broadband, local content

Living people
Residents of Lagos
Year of birth missing (living people)
21st-century Nigerian male actors
University of Lagos alumni
Nigerian male television actors